Boy with a Basket of Fruit is an oil on canvas painting generally ascribed to Italian Baroque master Michelangelo Merisi da Caravaggio, created c. 1593. It is held in the Galleria Borghese, in Rome.

Background
The painting dates from the time when Caravaggio, newly arrived in Rome from his native Milan, was making his way in the competitive Roman art world. The model was his friend and companion, the Sicilian painter Mario Minniti, at about 16 years old. The work was in the collection of Giuseppe Cesari, the Cavaliere d'Arpino, seized by Cardinal Scipione Borghese in 1607, and may therefore date to the period when Caravaggio worked for d'Arpino "painting flowers and fruits" in his workshop; but it may date from a slightly later period when Caravaggio and Minniti had left Cavalier d'Arpino's workshop (January 1594) to make their own way selling paintings through the dealer Costantino. Certainly it cannot predate 1593, the year Minniti arrived in Rome. It is believed to predate more complex works from the same period (also featuring Minniti as a model) such as The Fortune Teller and the Cardsharps (both 1594), the latter of which brought Caravaggio to the attention of his first important patron, Cardinal Francesco Maria Del Monte. Vittorio Sgarbi notes certain Murillesque portraiture qualities in the painting that could easily point to other painters in the Arpino workshop.

At one level the painting is a genre piece designed to demonstrate the artist's ability to depict everything from the skin of the boy to the skin of a peach, from the folds of the robe to the weave of the basket. The fruit is especially exquisite, and Professor Jules Janick of the Department of Horticulture and Landscape Architecture at Purdue University, Indiana, has analysed them from a horticulturalist's perspective:
The basket ... contains a great many fruits, all in nearly perfect condition and including a bi-colored peach with a bright red blush; four clusters of grapes — two black, one red, and one "white;" a ripe pomegranate split open, disgorging its red seeds; four figs, two of them dead-ripe, black ones, both split and two light-colored; two medlars; three apples—two red, one blushed and the other striped, and one yellow with a russet basin and a scar; two branches with small pears, one of them with five yellow ones with a bright red cheek and the other, half-hidden, with small yellow, blushed fruits. There are also leaves showing various disorders: a prominent virescent grape leaf with fungal spots and another with a white insect egg mass resembling that of the oblique banded leaf roller (Choristoneura rosaceana), and peach leaves with various spots.

The analysis indicates that Caravaggio is being realistic. By capturing only what was in the fruit basket, he idealizes neither their ripeness nor their arrangement—yet almost miraculously, we are still drawn in to look at it, for the viewer it is very much a beautiful and exquisite subject.

See also
List of paintings by Caravaggio

References

External links
Caravaggio's fruit (Professor Jules Janick)
 The British-Canadian band Velcro Hooks open up their video "A Love Song to T. S. Eliot" with a remarkable "live" reproduction of Boy with a Basket of Fruit.
 

1590s paintings
Paintings by Caravaggio
Paintings in the Borghese Collection
Food and drink paintings